Aylacophora is a genus of flowering plants in the family Asteraceae.

There is only one known species, Aylacophora deserticola, endemic to Neuquén Province of Argentina.

References

Monotypic Asteraceae genera
Astereae
Endemic flora of Argentina
Taxa named by Ángel Lulio Cabrera